Ķemeri resort (originally Ķemeres, also known as Kemmern)

is a part of Jūrmala in Latvia, 44 km from Riga. From 1928 to 1959, Ķemeri was a separate town, famous for healing mud baths and luxurious hotels. Approximately 2,200 inhabitants live there, while the main hotel is under reconstruction.

History

The name Ķemeri (Kemmern) first appears in written sources after the founding of the Dukedom of Courland in 1561. Documentary evidence indicates that the springs at Ķemeri first became known for their curative properties in 1796, the first chemical analysis of the spring water being performed in 1818. The residents of the nearby town of Sloka began to build houses for the patients. In 1825, the first public building was built for spa guests. Bad Kemmern was founded as a resort in 1838, when the emperor Nicholas I of Russia gave this land for building the first bath-house with mineral water. From then onwards people started to come here for treatment. 
The Ķemeri  railway station was established in 1877.

The Ķemeri resort became popular in the Russian Empire. In 1912, a direct railway link was created between Ķemeri and Moscow. The connection with the beach of Jaunķemeri was provided by electrical tram. Nerve disease as well as diseases of joints, bones, and muscles were treated in the resort. Treatment with sulfuring water and mud baths was also carried out. The annual number of people visiting the resort reached 8,300. During World War I, the battles between German and Russian forces lasting several years were only a few miles from Ķemeri. The resort was devastated and the train station was destroyed. 

The newly created Republic of Latvia tried to restore the previous glory of Ķemeri. In 1924, a special bathing facility was built for mud baths equipped with mechanical hot mud feed and the pumping of used mud back to the bog. In 1929, a 42-m-tall water tower with a sightseeing platform at the top was built near the bathing facility. Hotel Ķemeri, called "White Ship," has more than 100 rooms designed and built together by famous Latvian architect Eižens Laube and Spa Hotel's chief doctor and its director Dr. Janis Libietis. The hotel was opened to guests in 1936. Dr. Janis Libietis managed the Kemeri complex from 1928–1944 as he later sought asylum in Sweden.

In 1997, Ķemeri National Park was established.

In 1998, the sanatorium, after years of post -Sovietic abandonment, was purchased by Ominasis Italia and renovated according to a project by the Architect Cesare Stefano Bernardinelli.  

In 2014, the old abandoned hotel on Tūristu iela was demolished and the space is currently blank, with one last building to be demolished.
The state hotel is being renovated for tourism again.

References

External links

 Cultural History and Pictures of Ķemeri

Spa towns in Latvia
Resorts in Latvia
Springs of Latvia
Neighbourhoods in Jūrmala

fi:Ķemeri